Can't Stop Dreaming is a 1996 solo album by Daryl Hall. It was originally released in Japan as a Limited Collector's Edition with 12 tracks and was subsequently released in the United States on June 10, 2003, albeit missing one of its original tracks ("Something About You"), which was featured on the 2002 Hall & Oates album, Do It for Love.  All versions of the album contain a remake of the popular Hall & Oates song "She's Gone".

Track listings

Original 1996 release
 "Can't Stop Dreaming" (Walter Afanasieff, Hall, Alan Gorrie, Dan Shea) - 4:14
 "Let Me Be the One" (Gorrie, Hall, Melvin "Wah Wah" Regin) - 4:55
 "Something About You" (Hall, Sara Allen, David Bellochio) - 4:00
 "Cab Driver" (Louis Brown, Hall, Gorrie) - 5:22
 "Never Let Me Go" (Arthur Baker, Gorrie, Hall) - 4:29
 "Holding Out for Love" (Gorrie, Hall) - 3:57
 "Justify" (Brown, Hall) - 3:57
 "What's in Your World" (David Brown, Gorrie, Hall, Scott Parker) - 5:50
 "Hold On to Me" (Afanasieff, S. Allen, Gorrie, Hall) - 4:36
 "She's Gone" - (Hall, John Oates) 5:16
 "All by Myself"- (Gorrie, Hall) 5:00
 "Fools Rush In" - (Bellochio, Gorrie, Hall) 4:23

2003 version
"Cab Driver"
"Let Me Be the One"
"Can't Stop Dreaming"
"Never Let Me Go"
"Holding Out for Love"
"Justify"
"What's in Your World"
"Hold On to Me"
"She's Gone"
"All by Myself"
"Fools Rush In"

Singles
The album's lead single, "Cab Driver", did not chart on the Hot 100 in the US, but it did reach No. 21 on the Adult Contemporary chart in September 2003, staying there for four consecutive weeks and remaining on the chart for 13 weeks.

The next single, "What's in Your World", went to number 27 on the Adult Contemporary chart for one week on July 3, 2004 and remained on the chart for eight weeks.

Production 
 Producers – Daryl Hall (Tracks #1-8, 10 & 11); David Bellochio (Tracks #2-8, 10 & 11); Walter Afanasieff (Tracks #3, 7 & 8); Buster & Shovani (Tracks #6, 7 & 10); Michael Peden (Track #9).
 Engineers – Peter Moshay; Dana Chappelle (Tracks #3, 7 & 8); Frank Fagnano (Tracks #3, 6, 7, 8 & 10).
 Mixed by Peter Moshay
 Mastered by Bob Ludwig at Gateway Mastering (Portland, ME).
 Package Design – Phillips Design
 Photography – David A. Stewart

Personnel 
 Daryl Hall – lead and backing vocals, keyboards
 David Bellochio – keyboards (2-11), drums (3, 4, 5)
 Dan Shea – acoustic piano (3)
 Louis "Buster" Brown – keyboards (7)
 Scott "Shovani" Parker – keyboards (7)
 Alan Gorrie – guitars (1)
 Craig Ross – guitars (2, 11)
 Paul Livant – guitars (3, 4, 5, 9, 10)
 Bob Mayo – guitars (5)
 Ray Fuller – guitars (6)
 Dann Huff – guitars (7, 8)
 Wah-Wah Watson – guitars (10)
 Jack Daley – bass (2, 3, 6-11)
 Tom "T-Bone" Wolk – bass (9)
 Steven Wolf – drums (2, 11)
 Jerry Krenach – drums (8, 10)
 Rupert Brown – drum programming (9)
 Peter Moshay – percussion (2, 4, 5, 6, 8, 10, 11)
 Roger Ball – saxophone (1)
 Andy Snitzer – saxophone (2)
 Sandy Barber – backing vocals (2)
 Klyde Jones – backing vocals (2, 7, 8)
 Alexis England – backing vocals (7, 8)
 Lujuann Carter – backing vocals (7, 8)

Charts

References

Daryl Hall albums
1996 albums
Albums produced by Walter Afanasieff
Albums produced by Mike Peden